Micrelephas longicilia is a moth in the family Crambidae. It was described by Bernard Landry and Vitor Osmar Becker in 2013. It is found in Bahia, Brazil.

References

Moths described in 2013
Moths of South America